Julius Howland Barnes (February 2, 1873 – April 17, 1959) was an American industrialist and government official who served as chairman and President of the United States Chamber of Commerce. He played a role in the United States Food Administration during World War I, heading its grain division. He owned Barnes-Duluth Shipbuilding Company in Duluth, Minnesota.

Julius H. Barnes was born on February 2, 1873, in Little Rock, Arkansas. Barnes was featured on the May 5, 1930 cover of TIME Magazine. Barnes died on April 17, 1959, aged 86, in Duluth, Minnesota and is buried in Forest Hill Cemetery.

The Julius H. Barnes Points Trophy, a rowing award, still bears his name.

References

1873 births
1954 deaths
Businesspeople from Minnesota